The Jedburgh Railway was a  single-track branch railway in the Borders, Scotland, built by the Jedburgh Railway Company.

History

Authorised in 1855, the line was opened in July of the next year. It was run by the North British Railway from its opening and was absorbed by that company in 1860. The line closed to passengers on 13 August 1948, the day after large-scale flooding took out the bridge over the Teviot at Nisbet. The line closed to freight on 10 August 1964.

The track where the rails lay is now part of the Borders Abbeys Way walking route.

See also
The Kelso and Jedburgh railway branch lines

References

External links
The line on RailScot

Closed railway lines in Scotland
North British Railway
Pre-grouping British railway companies
Railway lines opened in 1856